The Lanzius L II was a single-seat fighter designed and built in the United States around 1918. The sole prototype is believed to have been tested at McCook Field.

Design and development

George Lanzius, an immigrant from Holland, founded the Lanzius Aircraft Company in New York, to develop his inventions for variable-camber and variable-incidence wings. Lanzius first designed and built a two-seat aircraft under a US Signal Corps contract in 1917, named the Lanzius Variable Speed Aeroplane (aka L I). His second aircraft, the L II, was a single-seater derived from the L I also featuring the cable operated variable-camber and incidence.

The two-bay wings had external trusses over the upper main-spars and under the lower main spars and the variable-camber and incidence were operated by cables and pulleys, with incidence variable from 0° to +15°. Power was supplied by a variety of engines but principally  by a  Packard 1A-1237 V-12 in-line water-cooled engine. During a test flight the engine failed and the L II crashed. Meanwhile, in April 1918, four similar aircraft were ordered, powered by  Liberty L-12 water-cooled V-12 engines. The first of these was destroyed after a structural failure in flight killed Lanzius test pilot L.E. Holt. The United States Army Air Service (USAS) rejected the remaining three aircraft and returned them to Lanzius.

Variants
Lanzius Variable Speed Aeroplane (1917) (L I) A two-seater built to a US Signal Corps contract in 1917, incorporating Lanzius' variable camber and incidence systemand powered by a  Duesenberg 4-cylinder water-cooled inline engine.
Lanzius L II A prototype single-seater fighting scout, powered by a  Packard 1A-1237 V-12 water-cooled engine.
Lanzuius Variable Speed Aeroplane (1918) Four aircraft similar to the L II, but powered by  Liberty L-12 engines.

Specifications (L II)

References

1910s United States fighter aircraft
Single-engined tractor aircraft
Biplanes
Aircraft first flown in 1918